Robert Corn could refer to: 

Rob Corn, American television producer
Robert Corn-Revere (born 1954), American attorney